Owen Ramsay Nares (11 August 1888 – 30 July 1943) was an English stage and film actor. Besides his acting career, he was the author of Myself, and Some Others (1925).

Early life
Educated at Reading School, Nares was encouraged by his mother to become an actor, and in 1908 he received his training from actress Rosina Filippi. The following year, he was playing bit parts in West End productions, including the St. James’s Theatre and the Pinero’s Mid Channel. Over the next few years, as his reputation grew, he performed with many of the outstanding actors of the era, including Beerbohm Tree, Constance Collier, and Marion Terry.

Career
In 1914, Nares appeared in Dandy Donovan, the first of the 25 silent films in which he appeared. The early 1920s was his golden period and he was the male lead opposite such actresses as Gladys Cooper, Fay Compton, Madge Titheradge and Daisy Burrell. His stage career also continued to flourish.

In 1915, he played Thomas Armstrong, opposite Doris Keane, in Edward Sheldon's Romance; it opened at the Duke of York's Theatre, transferring during the run to the Lyric Theatre. In 1917, he starred with Lily Elsie at the Palace Theatre in the musical comedy, Pamela. He appeared opposite Meggie Albanesi in The First and the Last for a long-run during the 1920s. In 1925, he appeared in The River by Patrick Hastings. Nares continued to star in popular West End shows, almost without pause, until 1926, when he then took a break and set off with his own company for a tour of South Africa.

Later years

With the advent of talkies, his considerable stage experience meant that, in the early days, he was still much in demand and starred in four films. He was, however, too mature to be the youthful, handsome star he had been a decade earlier. In the last six films he made, he played supporting roles. In 1942, he appeared in a revival of Robert E. Sherwood’s The Petrified Forrest, and afterwards he went on tour with the play to Northern England and Wales.

Family
Nares married actress Marie Pollini in 1910; the couple had two sons, David and Geoffrey.

Death
During tour through Wales, touring Army training camps, he visited Brecon, and the Shoulder of Mutton (now the Sarah Siddons public house), the birthplace of actress Sarah Siddons. While touring the room where Siddons was born, Nares had a heart attack and died shortly afterwards, aged 54, on 30 July 1943.

Filmography

Danny Donovan, the Gentleman Cracksman (1914) - Frank Ashworth
Just a Girl (1916) - Lord Trafford
Milestones (1916) - Lord Monkhurst
The Sorrows of Satan (1917) - Geoffrey Tempest
The Labour Leader (1917) - Gilbert Hazlitt
One Summer's Day (1917) - Captain Dick Rudyard
Flames (1917) - Valentine Creswell
Tinker, Tailor, Soldier, Sailor (1918) - John Tinker
The Man Who Won (1918) - Captain Bert Brook
Onward Christian Soldiers (1918) - The Soldier
Gamblers All (1919) - Harold Tempest
Edge O' Beyond (1919) - Dr. Cecil Lawson
The Elder Miss Blossom (1919) - Curate
The Last Rose of Summer (1920) - Oliver Selwyn
A Temporary Gentleman (1920) - Walter Hope
All the Winners (1920) - Tim Hawker
For Her Father's Sake (1921) - Walter Cardew
Brown Sugar (1922) - Lord Sloane
The Faithful Heart (1922) - Waverley Ango
The Indian Love Lyrics (1923) - Prince Zahindin
Young Lochinvar (1923) - Lochinvar
Miriam Rozella (1924) - Rudolph
This Marriage Business (1927) - Robert
Loose Ends (1930) - Malcolm Ferres
The Middle Watch (1930) - Captain Maitland
The Woman Between (1931) - Tom Smith
Sunshine Susie (1931) - Herr Arvray
Frail Women (1932) - The Man - Colonel Leonard Harvey
Aren't We All? (1932) - Willie
The Impassive Footman (1932) - Bryan Daventry
The Love Contract (1932) - Neville Cardington
There Goes the Bride (1932) - Max
Where Is This Lady? (1932) - Rudi Muller
Discord (1933) - Peter Stenning
One Precious Year (1933) - Stephen Carton
The Private Life of Don Juan (1934) - Antonio Martinez
Royal Cavalcade (1935) - Gentleman
I Give My Heart (1935) - Louis XV
Head Office (1936) - Henry Crossman
The Show Goes On (1937) - Martin Fraser
The Prime Minister (1941) - Lord Derby (Last appearance)

Selected stage roles
 Milestones (1912)
 Diplomacy (1913)
 Peter Ibbetson (1915)
 Romance (1915)
 Mr. Todd's Experiment (1920)
 The River (1925)
 Call It a Day (1935)

References

External links
 Performances listed in the Theatre Collection Archive at the University of Bristol

1888 births
1943 deaths
English male stage actors
English male film actors
English male silent film actors
People from Earley
People educated at Reading School
20th-century English male actors